Keshav Chopra (born 24 October 2001) is an American tennis player.

Personal life
From Marietta, Georgia, he attended IMG Academy and won the  IMG Academy 2019 Student Male Athlete of the Year Award prior to becoming a student at Georgia Tech.

Career
He made his ATP tour debut as a wildcard at the 2021 Atlanta Open – Doubles playing alongside Andres Martin in the first round.

References

2001 births
Living people
Tennis people from Georgia (U.S. state)
American male tennis players
Georgia Tech Yellow Jackets men's tennis players